Mietkowskie Lake (Polish: Jezioro Mietkowskie) - is the largest lake in the Dolnośląskie Voivodeship in Poland. The lake is a retention reservoir created when a dam was built on the river Bystrzyca in Mietków, about 45 kilometres south-east of Wrocław. Geographically the lake is located on the Świdnicka Plain; divided by the Bystrzyca Valley, located in the Bystrzyca Valley Landscape Park. The dam's construction began in 1974, and fully filled in 1986. The lake's dam has a length of 3,2 kilometres and a height of 17 metres. The lake's bank is excavated for aggregate, deepening the lake. The lake's water was lowered and the lake was renovated in 2007 and 2011.

References

Lakes of Lower Silesian Voivodeship